Vaughtia scrobiculata is a species of sea snail, a marine gastropod mollusc in the family Muricidae, the murex snails or rock snails.

Description
The length of the shell attains 14 mm.

(Described as Murex crawfordi G. B. Sowerby III, 1892) The solid shell is subventricose and acuminate. It is straw-colored. The sutures are channeled lengthwise. The shell consists of 5½ convex, rotund whorls with numerous raised lirae with small nodules cingulate in spirals. The body whorl is inflated and rotund. The aperture is ovate. The columella is smooth, slightly arcuate and abruptly truncated. The siphonal canal is very short. The outer lip is crenulate.

This species is closely allied to Vaughtia scrobiculata, but differs constantly in its shorter form, and the absence of a rostrum, the base of the columella being abruptly truncated. It may also be distinguished by the presence of an additional rib on the penultimate whorl.

Distribution
This marine species occurs off Cape of Good Hope, South Africa.

References

 Kilburn, R.N. & Rippey, E. (1982) Sea Shells of Southern Africa. Macmillan South Africa, Johannesburg, xi + 249 pp. page(s): 82
 Houart R. (1995) Pterymarchia n. gen. and Vaughtia n. gen., two new muricid genera (Gastropoda: Muricidae: Muricinae and Ocenebrinae). Apex 10(4): 127–136. 
 Steyn, D.G. & Lussi, M. (1998) Marine Shells of South Africa. An Illustrated Collector's Guide to Beached Shells. Ekogilde Publishers, Hartebeespoort, South Africa, ii + 264 pp.
 Petit R.E. (2009) George Brettingham Sowerby, I, II & III: their conchological publications and molluscan taxa. Zootaxa 2189: 1–218.
 Houart R., Kilburn R.N. & Marais A.P. (2010) Muricidae. pp. 176–270, in: Marais A.P. & Seccombe A.D. (eds), Identification guide to the seashells of South Africa. Volume 1. Groenkloof: Centre for Molluscan Studies. 376 pp.
 Lussi M. (2012) Description of three new species of Vaughtia from off the Eastern Cape, South Africa with a revision of the genus (Gastropoda: Prosobranchia: Muricidae) from Southern Madagascar. Malacologia Mostra Mondiale 76: 5-13

External links
 Philippi, R. A. (1845-1847). Abbildungen und Beschreibungen neuer oder wenig gekannter Conchylien. Zweiter Band. 2. Cassel: Fischer. 1-231, pls. 1-48.
 Küster, H. C. (1843-1860). Die Gattungen Buccinum, Purpura, Concholepas und Monoceros. In: Küster, H. C., Ed. Systematisches Conchylien-Cabinet von Martini und Chemnitz. Neu herausgegeben und vervollständigt. Dritten Bandes erste Abtheilung. 3(1): 1-229, pls 1-35. Nürnberg: Bauer & Raspe.
 Sowerby, G. B. III. (1892). Marine shells of South Africa. A catalogue of all the known species with references to figures in various works, descriptions of new species, and figures of such as are new, little known, or hitherto unfigured, London: G. B. Sowerby. 89 pp., 5 pls
 Tapparone Canefri, C. (1881). Glanures dans la faune malacologique de l'Ile Maurice. Catalogue de la famille des Muricidés. Société Malacologique de Belgique. 15: 7-99, pls 2-3
 Fischer, P. (1880-1887). Manuel de conchyliologie et de paléontologie conchyliologique, ou histoire naturelle des mollusques vivants et fossiles suivi d'un Appendice sur les Brachiopodes par D. P. Oehlert. Avec 23 planches contenant 600 figures dessinées par S. P. Woodward.. Paris: F. Savy. Published in 11 parts (fascicules), xxiv + 1369 pp., 23 pls

Ocenebrinae
Gastropods described in 1846